Lamb is an unincorporated community in Craig Township, Switzerland County, in the U.S. state of Indiana.

History
An early variant name of the community was called Erin. Erin had its start in 1815. A post office called Lamb was established in 1882, and remained in operation until it was discontinued in 1907.

Geography

References

Unincorporated communities in Switzerland County, Indiana
Unincorporated communities in Indiana